Edward Harry Mansfield Waller (8 December 1871 – 16 May 1942) was an eminent Anglican clergyman in the first half of the 20th century.

He was born on 8 December 1871 and educated at Highgate and Corpus Christi College, Cambridge. Ordained in 1894, he was successively assistant chaplain and vice principal of St Paul's Divinity School, Allahabad, principal of Jay Narayan's School, Benares,  secretary of the CMS (Indian Group) and canon of Lucknow before his elevation to the episcopate as the 3rd bishop of Tinnevelly. In 1923 he was translated to Madras, where he served for a further 18 years. He died on 16 May 1942.

Notes

1871 births
People educated at Highgate School
Alumni of Corpus Christi College, Cambridge
English Anglican missionaries
20th-century Anglican bishops in India
Anglican bishops of Tinnevelly
Anglican bishops of Madras
1942 deaths
Anglican missionaries in India